The National University of Advanced Legal Studies (NUALS) is a public law school and a National Law University located in Kochi, India. It is the first and only National Law University in the State of Kerala and one of the 24 NLUs in India. Admissions to the university are done on the basis of the Common Law Admission Test.

The National University of Advanced Legal Studies was established by the National University of Advanced Legal Studies Act, 2005, passed by the Legislative Assembly of the State of Kerala in 2005. The day-to-day management and administration of the university is undertaken by the Vice-Chancellor. Justice S. Siri Jagan (Retd.) is the current Acting Vice-Chancellor of the university from 24.01.2023. Dr. Asha G., the present Controller of Examinations is the Acting Registrar since 06.03.2023.

History 
The NUALS Act of 2005 merged the erstwhile National Institute for Advanced Legal Studies (NIALS), earlier established and managed by the Bar Council of Kerala and Bar Council of Kerala Trust. NUALS was inaugurated by Chief Justice K.G. Balakrishnan on 7 January 2006. The university was located in Kochi since it was the seat of the High Court of Kerala and Lakshadweep.

Faculty 
The permanent faculty of NUALS Includes Prof. (Dr.) Mini S, Dr. Balakrishnan K, Dr. Anil R. Nair, Dr. Liji O Samuel, Dr. Sheeba S. Dhar, Dr. Athira P. S., Mrs. Namitha K. L., Dr. Asif Emam, Dr. Abhayachandran K, Dr. Ambily Perayil, Dr. Aparna Sreekumar, Dr. Sandeep Menon Nandakumar, Mr. Raveendrakumar D, Mr. Hari S Nayar, Mrs. Nanditha Narayan, and Mrs. P. B. Arya. Since February 2020, seven sitting judges of the High Court of Kerala have been appointed as adjunct professors at NUALS.

Online Classes and Response to COVID-19 
NUALS has announced a temporary move to online classes from 1 July 2020 as part of its response to the COVID-19 pandemic. The university has announced that preparations had been made for the shift, including over 150 prerecorded online lectures, including from High Court judges, advocates, and other guest faculty. The university also responded by revamping its internal email servers to improve communication and information flow. Additionally, the Vice-Chancellor announced that viva-voce for LLB programmes, open defences for PhDs, and LLM Examinations would be conducted online.

Campus 
The university campus is spread over a 10-acre compound, located in Kalamaserry. The campus has an administrative block, academic block, two students' hostels, a faculty quarters, a seminar hall, an auditorium, an open air theatre, a library, a basketball court, a cricket net, a football field, a volleyball court, two badminton courts, two gyms, and a variety of indoor games.

Library 

The NUALS Library has over 13,000 books, making it one of the largest law libraries in Kerala, including extensive collections donated by eminent personalities including Justice VR Krishna Iyer, who donated his entire private library. The library also includes extensive online resources including WestLaw, Kluwer, HeinOnline, SCC Online and Manupatra.

Publications

NUALS Law Journal 
The university publishes the NUALS Law Journal (NLJ), a student-edited, biannual, double-blind law review. The Journal has been published since 2007. Since 2019, the NLJ has been published biannually online and accepts rolling submissions. The first biannual issue approximately coincided with the inception of the NLJ Blog and the passage of bylaws, codifying the journal's internal process.

NUALS Intellectual Property Law Review 
The NUALS Intellectual Property Law Review is a peer-reviewed, double blind and open access Journal, operating under the aegis of the Centre for Intellectual Property Rights (CIPR), NUALS. The journal focuses on contemporary issues that are at the forefront of IP and technology. The first volume of the journal was published in 2019. As of 2022, the journal has published three volumes.

Student Activities

NAALAM 
The NUALS Art And Literary Annual Meet is the annual cultural fest of NUALS. The fest, usually conducted over three days have a plethora of art, literary, legal and sport events. The flagship events are Alankara, the fashion show competition on night one, Choreonight, the group dance competition on day two and the headliner show, performed by music artists. Artists and bands including Masala Coffee, Thirumali, Hanumankind, Arcado, and Rakz Radiant have performed during Naalam.

Debate 
The university hosts the annual NUALS Parliamentary Debate (NPD) competition that follows the British Parliamentary Style. As of 2020, it had completed six editions. The NPD is organised by the NUALS Debating Society (DebSoc).

Moot Court

NUALS International Maritime Law Arbitration Competition 
At its inception in 2014, the NUALS International Maritime Law Arbitration Competition (NIMLAC) was the first maritime law moot in India.

International Moots 
In 2019, a team from NUALS finished as Runners-Up at the NLS Trilegal International Arbitration Moot, 2019. In 2019, NUALS emerged as semi-finalists at the World Rounds of the 23rd Stetson International Environmental Law Moot Court Competition. In 2020, NUALS won the World Rounds of the 24th Stetson International Environmental Law Moot Court Competition. In addition, the NUALS team won awards for Best Memorial, in addition to an individual speaker citation for 2nd Best Oralist.

National Moots 
In 2019, NUALS finished as Runners-Up at the NHRC-GNLU National Moot Court Competition, 2019. In 2019, NUALS won the 1st JGLS Antitrust Law Moot Court Competition conducted by Jindal Global Law School and Shardul Amarchand Mangaldas & Co. In 2020, NUALS won the 8th RMLNLU-SCC Online International Media Law Moot Court Competition, 2020.

Notable alumni
 Lieutenant Ambika Sudhakaran, Indian Navy
 Apoorva Bose, Communication Consultant at UNEP, Indian Cinema Actress
 Muthumani, Lawyer, Indian Cinema Actress
 Nihas Basheer, Partner at Wadia Ghandhy & Co.
 Nikhil Narendran, Partner at Trilegal
 Thomas George, Partner at Khaitan & Co.
 Wiseroy Damodaran, Partner at Trilegal

References

External links
 
 The NUALS Law Journal

Universities in Kochi
Law schools in Kerala
2005 establishments in Kerala
National Law Universities
Educational institutions established in 2005